Oidium manihotis is a plant pathogen affecting cassava.

See also
 List of cassava diseases

References

External links

Fungal plant pathogens and diseases
Root vegetable diseases
manihotis